Smoke is a 2018 Indian web series produced by Eros Motion Pictures and Humari Film Company. It was globally released on 26 October 2018, on Indian streaming platform Eros Now as an original series. The series is directed by Neel Guha.

Cast
Jim Sarbh as Roy
Kalki Koechlin as Tara
Mandira Bedi as Tia
Gulshan Devaiah as Jairam Jha (JJ)
Amit Sial as Pushkar
Neil Bhoopalam as Savio
Girish Kulkarni as CM Pavaskar
Satyadeep Misra as ACP Pereira
Prakash Belawadi as Bhau
Ravi Kale as Reddy 
Naved Aslam as Ex CM
Ganesh Yadav as S.I. Gune
Kallirroi Tziafeta as Mimi
Paniza Rahnama as Yana Duman
Vasuki
Luke Kenny
Tom Alter as Moshe

Festival screenings
Smoke premiered on MIPCOM 2018 in Cannes under the ‘Made in India Originals’ category on 15 October 2018.

References

2018 web series debuts